Likir is a village and headquarter of eponymous Subdivision in the Leh district of Ladakh, India. It is located in the Likir tehsil, in the Ladakh region. Khalatse is a nearby trekking place.

It is famous for the nearby Klu-kkhyil (meaning "water spirits") gompa (Buddhist monastery). The Likir Monastery was first built in the 11th century and was rebuilt in the 18th century, and currently has a  gold-covered Buddha statue. It is occupied by monks of the Gelukpa order. It is located 52 km from Leh.

Demographics
According to the 2011 census of India, Likir has 218 households. The effective literacy rate (i.e. the literacy rate of population excluding children aged 6 and below) is 72.93%.

References

Villages in Likir tehsil